Eres (English: "You Are") may refer to:

 "Eres" (Alejandro Fernández song), 2008
 "Eres" (Café Tacuba song), 2003
 "Eres", a song by Anahí from her album Inesperado, 2016
 "Eres", a song by José María Napoleón, 1975, later covered by multiple artists
 "Eres", a song by Lucero from her 1993 eponymous album
 "Eres", a song by Massiel, 1982
 "Eres", a song by Sergio Dalma, 2015
 "Eres", a song by Shakira from her album Peligro, 1993
 "Eres", a song by Los Super Reyes from their album Cumbia con Soul, 2009
 "Eres", a song by Tercer Cielo from their album Llueve, 2007
 Revista ERES, a Mexican magazine

See also
 Eres Tú (disambiguation)